Skobelev may refer to:

 Fergana, a city in Uzbekistan, called Skobelev between 1907 and 1920
 Skobelev Park, a museum park in the vicinity of Pleven, Bulgaria

Persons with the surname
Matvey Skobelev (1885–1938), Russian revolutionary and politician
Mikhail Skobelev (1843–1882), Russian general
Vladislav Skobelev (born 1987), Russian cross-country skier